Fotis Balopoulos (17 December 1943 – 3 November 2012) was a Greek professional footballer who played as a center back.

Club career
Balopoulos started playing football in his neighborhood club Enosi Korydallos and in 1958 he was transferred to Proodeftiki, where he had a successful spell, attracting the interest of the Olympiacos, Panathinaikos and AEK Athens. He played with Proodeftiki until 1964, both first and second national division after their establishment.

In the summer of 1964, he made the big transfer to AEK Athens, where he became more widely known and played their jersey for 6 seasons he won a championship and a Greek Cup. In the summer of 1969, when by decision of the Junta regime he was removed, with the accusation of being of left-wing political beliefs and then had to be sidelined from the club for a year.

In the summer of 1970 he went to Vyzas Megara, where he played for two years, during which he suffered several punishments and exclusions from the dictatorial regime and he even proceeded to refrain from football. In the summer of 1972 he moved to Atromitos, who had just been promoted to the first division and played for one year, when in the summer of 1973 ended his career.

International career
Balopoulos played a total of 10 times with the Greece, between 1965 and 1969. He made his debut on 23 May 1965 in an away match against the Soviet Union, as part of the 1966 FIFA World Cup qualifiers, under Lakis Petropoulos.

Personal life
His brother, Vangelis was also a footballer and they shared a common spell at Proodeftiki. He lived far from the public eye in Porto Rafti, until his death on 3 November 2012, at the age of 69.

Honours

Proodeftiki
Beta Ethniki: 1963–64

AEK Athens
Alpha Ethniki: 1967–68
Greek Cup: 1965–66

References

External links

1943 births
2012 deaths
Greece international footballers
AEK Athens F.C. players
Proodeftiki F.C. players
Vyzas F.C. players
Atromitos F.C. players
Footballers from Athens
Greek footballers
Association football defenders